Shri Balakrishna Guruji is a Reiki master and hypnotherapist known for his contributions in alternative medicine. Balakrishna Guruji is best known for popularizing drugless healing sciences like Reiki and hypnosis among health conscious Indians through his TV shows in TV9 Kannada and Kasturi channel.

See also
Reiki
Self-hypnosis
Pendulum

References

Limca Book of Records – 2010

External links
 SOMBO website http://www.sombo.in
 http://www.balakrishnaguruji.com/

1955 births
Living people
People from Mandya
Hypnotherapists
Recipients of the Rajyotsava Award 2010